Roger Haight  (born 1936) is an American Jesuit theologian and former president of the Catholic Theological Society of America. He is regarded as a knowledgeable and pioneering theologian, whose experiences with censorship have led to widespread debate over how to handle controversial ideas in the Catholic church today.

Biography
Haight received his BA (1960) and the MA in Philosophy (1961) from Berchmans College, Cebu City, Philippines; his STB from Woodstock College, Maryland (1967); the MA in Theology (1969) and the PhD in Theology (1973) from the University of Chicago; and the STL from the Jesuit School of Theology at Chicago.

Haight was the recipient of the "Alumnus of the Year, 2005" award from the Divinity School of the University of Chicago in April, 2006. He taught at the Jesuit graduate schools of theology in Manila, Chicago, Toronto, and Cambridge, MA. He has also been a visiting professor at universities in Lima, Nairobi, Paris, and in the Indian city of Pune.

In 2004, the Vatican's Congregation for the Doctrine of the Faith (CDF) barred Haight from teaching at the Jesuit Weston School of Theology in response to questions about his book Jesus Symbol of God (Orbis, 1999). The book is the winner of the 1999 top prize in theology from the US Catholic Press Association.

In September 2004, Haight began teaching at Union Theological Seminary, a leading multi-denominational seminary, as an adjunct professor of theology. In 2005 he wrote The Future of Christology in response to questions and concerns about Jesus Symbol of God.

In January 2009 the Congregation for the Doctrine of the Faith (CDF) barred Haight from writing on theology and forbade him to teach anywhere, including non-Catholic institutions. In 2011 he remained at Union Theological Seminary as a scholar in residence, focused on the adaptation of Ignatius' Spiritual Exercises for "seekers" today.

In 2015, the era of Pope Francis, Haight was somewhat reinstated and teaching at the Jesuit theologate in Toronto, Canada. His article on liberation theology was carried in a 1982 edition of Spirituality Today. He had published, in 2014, An Alternate Vision: An Interpretation of Liberation Theology. He also contributed to the Sisters of the Holy Name of Jesus and Mary series commemorating 50 years after Vatican II, with an interview on "Spirituality Today for all Seekers: The Gift of the Spiritual Exercises for All Seekers" which addresses the question of how to connect with the spirituality of people who do not consider themselves religious. In 2016 he published Spiritual and Religious: Explorations for Seekers, and in 2017 his "Theology of the Cross" was the topic of an article in the English Jesuit Heythrop Journal. In 2019 he published Faith and Evolution: A Grace-Filled Naturalism (Orbis, 2019), described by  George V. Coyne as "an original and rich contribution to the growing field of studies within the Christian tradition on the dynamic relationship among the natural sciences, theology, and religious faith."

Critiques of Jesus Symbol of God 
The CDF objected to Haight's attempts to separate Christology from Greek philosophical concepts, specifically in relation to the formulation of the mystery of the Trinity, the interpretation of Christ's divinity, and the role of Jesus in salvation. The clarifications Haight provided in 2000 were judged unsatisfactory by the CDF and in January 2001 it initiated a formal investigation which led to his 2004 removal from Catholic universities and 2009 complete silencing.

In 2005 John Allen, after a long review of diverse responses to Haight's Jesus Symbol of God, described it as "a work of vast erudition", and concluded:

The theological community appears divided over the Vatican's recent censure of Jesuit Fr. Roger Haight. Citing "grave doctrinal errors" in Haight's book Jesus Symbol of God, the Congregation for the Doctrine of the Faith issued a notification banning the priest from teaching Catholic theology. While some see Haight's "Christology from below" as a courageous exploration of new horizons, others see it as a cautionary tale about what happens when the culture becomes the lens for reading the Gospel rather than vice versa. Some who fault Haight have included those who have been critical of Vatican treatment of other theologians, but reluctantly concede that the congregation's notification of Haight may be justified, or at least expected.

Scholars are divided on whether the Vatican's reaction is counterproductive by ending debate within scholarly circles or whether it was necessary since Haight's ideas were being taught at a popular level.

In 2009, after the complete silencing of Haight, a response in the Jesuits' America magazine mentioned the usefulness of certain chapters of Jesus Symbol of God and that silencing interrupts the helpful process of scholarly criticism. The silencing received widespread coverage.

References

External links
 

1936 births
University of Chicago alumni
20th-century American Jesuits
21st-century American Jesuits
Jesuit theologians
American theologians
Living people
Dissident Roman Catholic theologians
Catholicism-related controversies
Presidents of the Catholic Theological Society of America
21st-century American Roman Catholic theologians